Melbourne City of Literature is a City of Literature located in Victoria, Australia, as part of the UNESCO Creative Cities Network. It was designated by UNESCO in 2008 as the second City of Literature, after Edinburgh. In 2014, the Melbourne City of Literature Office was established, directed by David Ryding. The Office is hosted at the Wheeler Centre and is dedicated to supporting Melbourne as a City of Literature through one-off programs and projects, partnerships with the literary sector, and international exchanges with other UNESCO Cities of Literature.

The Melbourne City of Literature Office is funded by Creative Victoria and the City of Melbourne. In 2017, the Office was awarded a "gold star assessment" from the UN.

Projects 
 Travel Fund
 Conference Subsidy Program
 Known Bookshops
 Walking the City of Literature
 Sleipnir's Literary Travels
 Public Artwork Design Concept Award 2017
 Art Book Fair (in association with the National Gallery of Victoria to assist the attendance of international book publishers)

References

External links
 Official website

Culture of Melbourne
UNESCO
Organisations based in Melbourne